Padua College may refer to two Roman Catholic schools in Australia:

 Padua College (Brisbane)
 Padua College (Melbourne)